Harlan Crews Hodges (November 11, 1902 – June 6, 1994) was an American college basketball coach and educator. He was the head coach at Murray State (1948–54) and Idaho (1954–59), then became a high school administrator.

Early career
Hodges' coaching career began at West Frankfort High School in West Frankfort, Illinois. In his 12 seasons at WFHS, Hodges' Redbirds won their regional tournament three times, their sectional tournament twice, and made it to the state championship four times. He spent one season as the head basketball and track coach at the Missouri School of Mines before returning to his alma mater, Southern Illinois as an assistant basketball and football coach.

Murray State
Hodges was hired at Murray State College in Murray, Kentucky, in the spring of 1948. His 1950–51 and 1951–52 teams finished the year ranked No. 16 in the years' end AP poll. His teams twice made the NAIA Division I men's basketball tournament and was runner up in 1952. Two of Hodges' players at Murray State, Bennie Purcell and Garrett Beshear, received All-American honors. His overall record at Murray State was 109–66.

Idaho
In May 1954, Hodges became head coach at the University of Idaho in the Pacific Coast Conference, replacing Chuck Finley, who departed after seven seasons for Mississippi Southern. His starting salary was $7,320, and in his five years in Moscow, Hodges had a 52–77 record with the Vandals and no tournament appearances. His best season was his fourth in 1957–58, when they were 17–9 and finished fourth in the PCC at 9–7. He resigned in late April 1959 to become a high school superintendent in Anna, Illinois.

After coaching
After Idaho, Hodges was superintendent at Anna-Jonesboro Community High School for five years, then returned to Murray State to teach in 1964, and retired in 1973. He died in 1994 at age 91.

Head coaching record

College basketball

References

External links
 Sports Reference – Harlan Hodges
 

1902 births
1994 deaths
American men's basketball coaches
Basketball coaches from Illinois
College track and field coaches in the United States
High school basketball coaches in the United States
Idaho Vandals men's basketball coaches
Missouri S&T Miners men's basketball coaches
Murray State Racers men's basketball coaches
People from Wayne County, Illinois
Place of birth missing
Southern Illinois Salukis football coaches
Southern Illinois Salukis men's basketball coaches
Southern Illinois University Carbondale alumni